Ophyx pseudoptera is a moth of the family Erebidae first described by Oswald Bertram Lower in 1903. It is found in Papua (including Roon Island, Supiori, Biak Island), Papua New Guinea and Australia, where it has been recorded from Queensland. The habitat consists of lowland areas.

The forewings have a vague pale spot near the wingtip, and a dark brown band across the middle.

References

Ophyx
Moths of Australia
Moths described in 1903
Moths of Papua New Guinea
Moths of Indonesia